Secret of the Incas is a 1954 American adventure film directed by Jerry Hopper and starring Charlton Heston as adventurer Harry Steele, on the trail of an ancient Incan artifact. Shot on location at Machu Picchu in Peru, the film is often credited as the inspiration for Raiders of the Lost Ark. The supporting cast features Robert Young, Nicole Maurey and Thomas Mitchell, as well as a rare film appearance by Peruvian singer Yma Sumac.

Plot
American adventurer Harry Steele (Charlton Heston) earns a living as a tourist guide in Cusco, Peru but plans to make his fortune by finding the Sunburst, an Inca treasure. He possesses an ancient carved stone which gives the location of the Sunburst but has no means to travel there. He is also menaced by his dubious associate Ed Morgan (Thomas Mitchell) who wants the treasure for himself and tries to have Harry killed.

When Romanian defector Elena Antonescu (Nicole Maurey) arrives, Harry apparently agrees to help her travel to Mexico so she can then get to America, but in reality he uses her situation to his own advantage. Together with Elena, he steals a plane used by a Romanian official who is attempting to get Elena to return and uses it to fly to Machu Picchu.

There he discovers an archaeological expedition headed by Dr Stanley Moorehead (Robert Young), who is preparing to enter the tomb where the Sunburst is said to be located. Moorehead becomes infatuated with Elena, while Morgan arrives and coerces Harry into helping him find the treasure. While Morgan is asleep, Harry slips away and enters the tomb, locating the Sunburst hidden inside a hollow pillar.

Morgan then appears and grabs the Sunburst at gunpoint before shooting his way out of the temple while being pursued by Harry and a group of locals. Trapping Morgan on a cliff edge, Harry gets the Sunburst back while Morgan falls to his death. Rather than take it for himself, he gives the Sunburst back to the local Indians who believe it must be returned to the temple.

Cast
 Charlton Heston as Harry Steele
 Robert Young as Stanley Moorhead
 Nicole Maurey as Elena Antonescu
 Thomas Mitchell as Ed Morgan
 Glenda Farrell as Mrs. Winston
 Yma Sumac as Kori-Tika
Michael Pate as Pachacutec
Leon Askin as Anton Marcu
William Henry as Phillip Lang
Marion Ross as Miss Morris
Alvy Moore as man in bar

Production
The film was originally known as Legend of the Incas. Paramount announced it as part of their 1953 slate in July 1952. Adventure films set outside America were popular in Hollywood at the time; producer Mel Epstein says that Paramount decided to make this film mostly because there had not been one shot in Peru before.

Wendell Corey was originally announced as the leading star. In July 1953  Paramount took over Hal B. Wallis' contract with Charlton Heston and announced he would make the film after he finished The Naked Jungle.

Secret of the Incas was filmed on location in Peru at Cuzco and Machu Picchu, the first time that a major Hollywood studio filmed at this archeological site.  A sixteen-person unit, including Heston, producer Mel Epstein and director Jerry Hopper, spent a month filming footage in Peru in 1953.

Five hundred indigenous people were used as extras.

The film also featured the Peruvian singer Yma Sumac as Kori-Tica.

The female lead was to have been played by Viveca Lindfors. However, after the positive response to Nicole Maurey's performance in Little Boy Lost Paramount gave her the role. Thomas Mitchell was signed to play the villain.

Studio filming started in October 1953. Shortly beforehand, Wendell Corey dropped out of the film. He was replaced by Robert Young. Filming ended on 22 November.

The film caused a surge in tourism to Peru in 1954.

Influence on Raiders of the Lost Ark

The film is often cited by film buffs as a direct inspiration for the Indiana Jones film franchise, with many of the scenes in Raiders of the Lost Ark bearing a striking resemblance in tone and structure to scenes in Secret of the Incas. Throughout Secret of the Incas, the main character, Harry Steele, can be seen wearing what would later become known as the "Indiana Jones" outfit: brown leather jacket, fedora, tan pants, an over-the-shoulder bag, and revolver. The character also sometimes wears a light beard, unusual for films of its time, and there is a tomb scene involving a revelatory shaft of light similar to the "Map Room" sequence in Raiders.

Raiders''' costume designer Deborah Nadoolman Landis noted that the inspiration for Indiana's costume was Charlton Heston's Harry Steele in Secret of the Incas: "We did watch this film together as a crew several times, and I always thought it strange that the filmmakers did not credit it later as the inspiration for the series" and quipped that the film is "almost a shot for shot Raiders of the Lost Ark."

Other media
On December 14, 1954, Charlton Heston and Nicole Maurey reprised their roles in a Lux Radio Theater version of Secret of the Incas.

References

External links
 
 

 Review @ TheRaider.Net
 "Indiana Heston" by Brian Mosely  – Times-Gazette'' – Shelbyville, Tennessee – Posted Sunday, April 27, 2008, at 5:03 PM
 "Charlton Heston: The First Indiana Jones?" by  Richard von Busack – Cinematical.com – Posted April 8, 2008 12:32 PM

1954 films
1954 adventure films
American adventure films
Films directed by Jerry Hopper
Films scored by David Buttolph
Films set in Peru
Films shot in Peru
Films with screenplays by Ranald MacDougall
Paramount Pictures films
Romanian-language films
1950s Spanish-language films
1950s English-language films
1950s American films